Burak Kapacak (born 8 December 1999) is a Turkish professional footballer who plays as a left wing for Turkish club Fatih Karagümrük on loan from Fenerbahçe.

Professional career
A youth product of Bursaspor, Burak signed his first professional contract on 26 March 2018. Kapacak made his professional debut for Bursaspor in a 1-0 Süper Lig loss to Gençlerbirliği S.K. on 18 May 2018.

Fenerbahçe 
On 6 August 2021, Fenerbahce announced that they have signed an agreement with Kapacak.

References

External links
 
 
 
 

1999 births
Living people
People from Osmangazi
Turkish footballers
Turkey youth international footballers
Bursaspor footballers
Süper Lig players
Association football fullbacks